Daniel Günther (born 24 July 1973) is a German politician who is a member of the Christian Democratic Union of Germany (CDU). Since 28 June 2017, he has served as the Minister President of Schleswig-Holstein. From 1 November 2018 to 31 October 2019, he served as President of the Bundesrat, being succeeded by Dietmar Woidke.

Early life and education 
Günther studied politics and psychology at University of Kiel.

Career

Career in state politics
Günther has been a member of Landtag of Schleswig-Holstein. since the 2009 state elections. In parliament, he was a member of the Committee on Education (2009–2014) and the Finance Committee (2009–2012). From 2014 until 2017, he served as chairman of the CDU parliamentary group. In this capacity, he was also a member of the Council of Elders.

When Ingbert Liebing resigned in late 2016 from his role as leading candidate for the 2017 state elections after consistently bad polling results, Günther was elected by the party members to lead the party into the election. After assuming the leadership, Günther led the party to a victory with 30.8% of the vote.   He became the Minister-President of Schleswig-Holstein on 28 June 2017 and was re-elected in 2022. As one of the state's representatives at the Bundesrat, he also serves on the Committee on Foreign Affairs.

Role in national politics
Günther was a CDU delegate to the Federal Convention for the purpose of electing the President of Germany in 2017 and 2022. In the – failed – negotiations to form a coalition government with the Christian Social Union in Bavaria (CSU), the Free Democratic Party (FDP) and the Green Party following the 2017 national elections, he was part of the 19-member delegation of the CDU. In the ensuing negotiations with the Social Democrats, he led the working group on transport and infrastructure, this time alongside Thomas Strobl and Sören Bartol.

Together with Bernd Althusmann, Monika Grütters, Michael Kretschmer and Armin Laschet, Günther co-chaired the CDU’s national convention in Berlin in February 2018. Daniel Günther was his party's lead candidate for the 2022 Schleswig-Holstein State Election in which the party was the lead vote-getter with 43.4%.

Other activities
 Deutsches Museum, Member of the Board of Trustees
 Schleswig-Holstein Musik Festival, Ex-Officio chairman of the board of Trustees (since 2017)
 State Agency for Civic Education, Member of the Board of Trustees (since 2012)
 Stadtwerke Eckernförde, Member of the Supervisory Board (1998–2005)

Political positions
Ahead of the Christian Democrats’ leadership election in 2018, Günther publicly endorsed Annegret Kramp-Karrenbauer to succeed Merkel as the party's chair. For the 2021 leadership election, he later endorsed Armin Laschet, and supported him as the Christian Democrats' joint candidate to succeed Chancellor Angela Merkel in the 2021 national elections.

Personal life
Günther is married to a pediatrician. The couple have two daughters.

See also
List of Minister-Presidents of Schleswig-Holstein

References

External links
 Landtag of Schleswig-Holstein. Daniel Günther

Ministers-President of Schleswig-Holstein
21st-century German politicians
Presidents of the German Bundesrat
Christian Democratic Union of Germany politicians
Members of the Landtag of Schleswig-Holstein
Politicians from Kiel
1973 births
Living people
Ministers of the Schleswig-Holstein State Government